Dolce Amore (English: Sweet Love) is a 2016 Philippine romantic drama television series directed by Mae Cruz-Alviar, Cathy Garcia-Molina and Richard Arellano, starring Liza Soberano and Enrique Gil. The series aired on ABS-CBN's Primetime Bida evening block and worldwide on The Filipino Channel from February 15, 2016 to August 26, 2016, replacing Pangako sa 'Yo, and was replaced by Till I Met You.

This series was streaming online on YouTube.

Synopsis
Serena Marchesa (Liza Soberano) is a young and beautiful Filipina woman who was adopted by a rich Italian father and mother when she was an infant. When she found herself stuck in an arranged marriage, she runs away to the Philippines, a country she had been fascinated by since she was little from the stories she heard from her Filipina nanny and the stories that her Penpal friend from the Philippines have been talking about. There, she meets and falls in love with her Penpal friend, Simon, also known as Tenten (Enrique Gil), a poor and hardworking adopted boy from Tondo who took unconventional jobs for his family.

Cast and characters

Main cast

 Liza Soberano as Serena Marchesa-Ibarra / Monica Urtola

 Hannah F. Lopez Vito as young Serena / Monica
She is a Filipina who was adopted by a rich Italian man as an infant. She is raised as a 'princess', with several servants around her at all times, including a Filipina nanny. Despite her upbringing, she longs for a simple life, which her mother disapproves of. She is fascinated by the Philippines, from the stories she hears from her nanny and from her father who always speaks to her in Tagalog and later on reveals her true parentage. Attempting to escape her arranged marriage to her best friend, she travels to the Philippines to search for a young billionaire who can save her family's company. After Simon’s brother kidnaps Serena, Simon tries to save her but Serena does not believe Simon so they got on an accident, Serena have amnesia and her family went to Italy. When Serena find out the truth Serena got angry at Simon but in the end they become lovers.
 Enrique Gil as Simon Vicente "Tenten" Ibarra
 Marc Santiago as young Tenten
He is a sickly orphan who lived in an orphanage before he was adopted by a family. They lost everything after he falls ill, and he had to start taking unconventional jobs to get their house back. He meets Serena while doing one of his jobs, as a call boy, under the impression that she was hiring him.

Supporting cast
 Matteo Guidicelli as Giancarlo de Luca
He is Serena's childhood best friend from Italy. He seemed to be madly in love with Serena that he will go to any lengths to make her marry him. 
 Cherie Gil as Luciana Marchesa
Serena's Italian adoptive mother and Tenten's biological mother. She was initially against the adoption of Serena, which her husband decided on without her consent. She also doesn't approve of Serena's wishes to live a simple life because she believes "the worst thing in life is to be ordinary".
 Sunshine Cruz as Alice Urtola
A nurse and refugee in the fictional country of Askovia. She was separated from her husband and two daughters after an explosion during a war in the 1990s.
 Edgar Mortiz as Ruben "Dodoy" Ibarra
Tenten's adoptive father and Taps' husband.
 Rio Locsin as Pilita "Taps" Ibarra
A cook in the orphanage where Tenten was in and eventually became Tenten's adoptive mother.
 Kean Cipriano as Alvin "Binggoy" Ibarra
Dodoy and Taps' eldest son and Tenten's adoptive brother.
 Ruben Maria Soriquez as Roberto Marchesa
Serena's adoptive father who longed to have a child which was impossible for him and his barren wife. He raised her as his own and taught her about the Filipino culture, often speaking to her and telling her stories in Tagalog, since he himself was also raised by a Filipino nanny.
 Andrew E. as Eugene "Uge" Urtola
Alice's husband and Serena's biological father. He was separated from his wife and children in the war of Askovia.
 Sue Ramirez as Angela "Angel" Urtola
Serena's biological sister. She was separated from her sister after an explosion during a war in 1990s of Askovia.
 Matteo Tosi as Silvio De Luca
The father of Giancarlo
 Alvin Anson as Favio De Luca
The uncle of Giancarlo. 
 Tetchie Agbayani as Vivian Dubois
She introduced herself as Simon's real mother.
 Joseph Marco as River Cruz
 Franchesca Floirendo as Hannah Conde

Production 
After the success of Forevermore, Liza Soberano and Enrique Gil were once again paired up, a year later. They are joined by rapper Andrew E., who will be making his teleserye debut in ABS-CBN through the show. The show also marks the return of veteran actress Cherie Gil to ABS-CBN, playing the role of Luciana Marchesa. Aside from Gil, Edgar Mortiz will also be returning to acting, almost 10 years after his last show. The show was shot in the Philippines and in Italy. Filming in Italy began in early December 2015, when the cast headed to Rome to shoot some scenes. Scenes were also shot in other Italian cities, including Bologna, Florence
, and Venice. Filipino-Italian actor Ruben Maria Soriquez, who plays Roberto Marchesa, had to help the cast with language.

Episodes

Reception

Critical response

Just the start of the pilot week, people were fascinated about the plot of its first episode titled, "Sweet Beginning". According to spot.ph, "LizQuen's new telenovela doesn't seem like your typical telenovela, which is kind of a good thing." Also they added, "We watched the first episode to see if the show can fill the Forevermore-shaped role in our hearts, and we weren't disappointed."

When the story is about to fold its storytelling. Nestor U. Torre of the Philippine Daily Inquirer evaluated the plus and minus effects it’s had on its key players. On Cherie Gil "All too often, other tisoy stars stumble and fumble when they portray non-Filipinos, but Cherie’s approximation of Liza Soberano’s Italian foster mother in “Dolce Amore” is more convincing." While on Ruben Maria Soriquez 
as Liza’s dad "has also more than passed muster, so we hope to see him on local screens again after the show’s conclusion. As for second-lead player "Matteo Guidicelli’s own portrayal of Liza’s Italian best friend and most ardent suitor, the young actor similarly did well. Matteo’s character took a disturbing and even shockingly “darker” tone." This gave him an opportunity to play his “villain” card for attention-calling contrast, and he ended up as more than just a “third leg” in the series’ stellar support structure."

As for the show’s leads, "Liza Soberano is clearly the biggest beneficiary of its success. Her combination of telegenic beauty, youth, charisma and increasing stellar “confidence” has made her the young-adult female star du jour and on the local TV screen. To underscore and challenge her stellar promise, “Dolce Amore” gave her many different moods and styles to vivify—making her thespic task more difficult, but also enhancing its impact and success."
In instructive contrast, "Enrique Gil hasn’t done as swimmingly, shiningly well because he’s generally opted to play it appealingly cute and boy-next-door for too much, too long in the show’s run. Much later in the series, Enrique did get a chance to show what else he could do, when his character was made to turn hard and rich and cold-hearted."

Reruns
Dolce Amore re-aired on Kapamilya Channel and A2Z on May 3, 2021 to November 12, 2021 replacing Bagong Umaga and was replaced by the reruns of Love Thy Woman. The series was also made available for streaming on Netflix in the Philippines starting December 7, 2021.

Awards and nominations

Rating

International broadcast
The series was aired in Malaysia (dubbed into Malay language) on Astro Prima and Astro Maya HD, started from September until December 2017.

See also
 List of programs broadcast by ABS-CBN
 List of telenovelas of ABS-CBN

References

External links
 

ABS-CBN drama series
Philippine romantic comedy television series
Philippine melodrama television series
2016 Philippine television series debuts
2016 Philippine television series endings
Television series by Star Creatives
Television shows filmed in Italy
Television shows set in the Philippines
Filipino-language television shows